Admiral Holmes may refer to:

Charles Holmes (Royal Navy officer) (1711–1761), British Royal Navy rear admiral
Ephraim P. Holmes (1908–1997), U.S. Navy admiral
John Holmes (Royal Navy officer) (c. 1640–1683), English admiral
Robert Holmes (Royal Navy officer) (c. 1622–1692), English admiral

See also
Herbert Edward Holmes à Court (1869–1934), British Royal Navy vice admiral